Interleukin 36 receptor antagonist (IL-36RA) is a member of the interleukin-36 family of cytokines. It was previously named Interleukin-1 family member 5 (IL1F5).

The protein is known to inhibit the effects of Interleukin-36 cytokines (IL-36α, IL-36β and IL-36γ) via competing with their receptor IL-36R/IL1RL2 and thereby inhibiting their proinflammatory effects.

Roles in disease
Mutations in the IL-36RN gene resulting in a decrease or production of defective IL-36RA protein have been shown to cause inflammatory skin diseases including generalised pustular psoriasis, acrodermatitis continua suppurativa Hallopeau (ACH) and acute generalized exanthematous pustulosis (AGEP).

References

Further reading

Cytokine receptors